The following is a timeline of the history of the city of Cádiz, Spain.

Prior to 20th century

 1104 BCE - Gadir founded by Phoenicians.
 530 BCE - Gades occupied by Carthaginians.
 49 BCE - Julius Caesar conferred the civitas of Rome on the citizens of Gades.
 4 CE - Birth of Columella, a prominent writer on agriculture.
 200 CE - Population: 20,000.
 711 CE - Moors in power (until 1262) & city called "Jezirat-Kadis."
 1217 -  The city was raided by a group of Frisian crusaders en route to the Holy Land.
 1241 - Roman Catholic Diocese of Cádiz established.
 1262 - Cádiz taken by Alfonso X of Castile.
 1492 - Discovery of America renewed its prosperity.
 1587 - Spanish fleet attacked and Cádiz raided by Sir Francis Drake.
 1596 - Capture of Cádiz by English and Dutch forces; city sacked.
 1602 -  rebuilt.
 1625 - November: Attempted English and Dutch Cádiz Expedition.
 1656 - 9 September: Battle of Cádiz; English win.
 1702
 Battle of Cádiz.
 Population: 30,000.
 1706 - Castle of San Sebastián (Cádiz) constructed.
 1717 - Casa de Contratación (House of Trade) relocated to Cádiz from Seville.
 1722 - Cádiz Cathedral construction begins.
 1748 - Real Colegio de Cirugía de la Armada established.(es)
 1749 - Jardín Botánico (garden) founded (approximate date).
 1787 - Population: 71,080.
 1797 - June: British Assault on Cádiz; Spaniards win.
 1800 - Bombarded by Nelson.
 1810
 February: French Siege of Cádiz begins.
 24 September: Cortes of Cádiz (national assembly) convenes in Cádiz.
 1810-1813 - Population: 85,000.
 1812
 19 March: Spanish Constitution of 1812 adopted after deliberations of the Cortes of Cádiz.
 August: Siege of Cádiz ends.
 1823
 May: Ferdinand VII of Spain imprisoned at Cádiz.
 31 August: Battle of Trocadero.
 1829 - "Cádiz declared a free port."
 1838 - Cádiz Cathedral construction completed.
 1842 - Population: 53,922.
 1860 - Population: 71,521.
 1867 - Diario de Cádiz newspaper begins publication.
 1868 - The Glorious Revolution centred on Cádiz.
 1873 - Cantonalist  proclaimed.
 1900 - Population: 69,382.

20th century

 1905 - Gran Teatro Falla (theatre) built.
 1910
 Cádiz Club de Fútbol formed.
 Population: 67,306.
 1930 - Population: 75,789.
 1932 - Cine Gades (cinema) active.
 1947 - Cádiz Explosion takes place.
 1949 -  (theatre) opens.
 1950 - Population: 100,249.
 1955 - Estadio Ramón de Carranza (stadium) opens.
 1969 -  (film festival) begins.
 1970 - Museum of Cádiz established.
 1979 - University of Cádiz established.
 1986 -  begins.
 1991 - Population: 157,355.
 1995 - Teófila Martínez becomes mayor.

21st century

 2011 - Population: 124,014.
 2015 - José María González Santos becomes mayor.

See also
 
 List of mayors of Cadiz
 Timelines of other cities in the autonomous community of Andalusia: Almería, Córdoba, Granada, Jaén, Jerez de la Frontera, Málaga, Seville
 List of municipalities in Andalusia

References

This article incorporates information from the Spanish Wikipedia.

Bibliography

in English
Published in the 19th century
 
 
 
 
 
 

Published in the 20th century
 
 
 
 
Published in the 21st century

in Spanish

External links

 Items related to Cádiz, various dates (via Europeana)
 Items related to Cádiz, various dates (via Digital Public Library of America)

Cádiz
Cádiz